Lac de Saint-Point (also Lac de Malbuisson) is a lake formed by the river Doubs near Pontarlier in the Doubs department of France. With a surface area of 5.2 km², it is one of the largest natural lakes of France.

See also
 www.malbuisson.fr - Official website of Malbuisson - For general information and tourism
Saint-Point-Lac

Saint Point
LSaint Point